Jacob Appelbaum (born 1 April 1983) is an American independent journalist, computer security researcher, artist, and hacker. 

Appelbaum studied at the Eindhoven University of Technology and was a core member of the Tor project, a free software network designed to provide online anonymity, until he stepped down from his position over sexual abuse allegations which surfaced in 2016. He was among several people to work with NSA contractor Edward Snowden's top secret documents released in 2013. He has contributed extensively as a journalist to the publication of those documents. His journalistic work has been published in Der Spiegel and elsewhere. Appelbaum is also known for representing WikiLeaks. He has displayed his art in a number of institutions across the world and has collaborated with artists such as Laura Poitras, Trevor Paglen, and Ai Weiwei.

Under the pseudonym "ioerror," Appelbaum was an active member of the Cult of the Dead Cow hacker collective from 2008 to 2016, when sexual abuse allegations led to him being the only person to ever be ejected from the group. He was the co-founder of the San Francisco hackerspace Noisebridge with Mitch Altman. He worked for Kink.com and Greenpeace and volunteered for the Ruckus Society and the Rainforest Action Network.

Many of these organizations, as well as his employer Tor, ended their association with Appelbaum in June 2016 following allegations of sexual abuse. After a seven-week investigation led by an outside investigator, Tor concluded that many of the allegations of misconduct were accurate. Appelbaum has denied the allegations. Various activists and others publicly supported Appelbaum, voicing concerns about due process, trial by social media, and questioning the claims, while others credit the incident with changing the information security community's attitude towards sheltering known abusers. The affair has had repercussions in the online privacy advocacy world. U.S. news media treated the allegations as credible, and reactions in Germany were mixed.

Early life and education
Appelbaum says that he tested out of high school and attended junior college briefly before he "stopped college and continued [his] education." In a wide-ranging interview with Rolling Stone magazine in 2010, Appelbaum revealed that he comes from "a family of lunatics... [a]ctual, raving lunatics." He stated that his mother "is a paranoid schizophrenic" who "insisted that Jake had somehow been molested by his father while he was still in the womb". He was taken away from his mother by his aunt when he was 6. Two years later, he was placed in a children's home in Sonoma County. At age 10, his indigent father was awarded custody of him. According to him, having been introduced to computer programming by a friend's father saved his life: "The Internet is the only reason I'm alive today." Appelbaum says that he developed OCD at a young age. He has also stated that his father, who struggled with heroin addiction, has been murdered by poisoning.

Starting in 2015, Appelbaum was a Ph.D. student studying under Tanja Lange and Daniel J. Bernstein at the Eindhoven University of Technology. He received his Ph.D. in March 2022.

Career

Journalism 
Appelbaum was among several people to gain access to former NSA contractor Edward Snowden's top secret documents released in 2013. He has contributed extensively as a journalist to the publication of those documents.

On 23 October 2013, Appelbaum and other writers and editors at Der Spiegel reported that their investigations had led German Chancellor Angela Merkel to confront the U.S. government over evidence that it was monitoring her personal cell phone.
US President Barack Obama issued an ambiguously worded denial and apology.
The Der Spiegel team reported on the resulting controversy and detailed a further claim that the Embassy of the United States, Berlin, was being used as a base of operations for electronic surveillance of its German ally.
The BBC commented that "This scandal has caused one of the biggest diplomatic rifts between Germany and the U.S. in recent years."
At the scandal's peak, Merkel compared the National Security Agency with the East German Stasi secret police during an angry conversation with Obama.

The Der Spiegel team's reporting about Merkel earned the 2014 Henri Nannen prize for investigative journalism. A few days later he provoked a furor by condemning Nannen, the prize's namesake, for his Nazi collaboration, declaring that he would have his bronze bust of Nannen melted down and recast, and donate his prize money to anti-fascist groups.

On 28 December 2013, at the Chaos Communication Congress, he presented documents showing that the NSA can turn iPhones into eavesdropping tools and has developed devices to harvest electronic information from a computer even if the computer is not online. An investigative team at Der Spiegel, including Appelbaum, simultaneously published their findings, along with a descriptive list of the surveillance devices making up the NSA ANT catalog.

On 3 July 2014, German broadcaster NDR/ARD carried disclosures by Appelbaum and others about the operation of NSA's top-secret XKeyscore surveillance software, including source code proving that a computer of Appelbaum's had been targeted.

On 28 December 2014, Der Spiegel again drew from the Snowden documents to assess the NSA's ability to crack encrypted Internet communications.
In a separate article, they described how British and American intelligence used covert surveillance to target, often inaccurately, suspected Taliban fighters and drug smugglers for killing.

Appelbaum has appeared several times on Democracy Now! as a security researcher, privacy activist, and target of government surveillance.
He appeared with Julian Assange on Episode 8 & 9 of World Tomorrow, "Cypherpunks".

He is a contributor to Julian Assange's 2012 book Cypherpunks: Freedom and the Future of the Internet along with Andy Müller-Maguhn and Jérémie Zimmermann.

Appelbaum was a member of the outside volunteer technical advisory board of the Freedom of the Press Foundation  until 8 June 2016.

Technology 
In 2005, Appelbaum gave two talks at the 22nd Chaos Communication Congress, Personal Experiences: Bringing Technology and New Media to Disaster Areas, and A Discussion About Modern Disk Encryption Systems. At the 2006 23rd Chaos Communication Congress, he gave a talk with Ralf-Philipp Weinmann titled Unlocking FileVault: An Analysis of Apple's Encrypted Disk Storage System.

Appelbaum has collaborated on several other high-profile research projects.
 The cold boot attack, with J. Alex Halderman, Seth Schoen, Nadia Heninger, William Clarkson, William Paul, Joseph A. Calandrino, Ariel J. Feldman, and Edward W. Felten. Winner of USENIX Security Best Student Paper award and the Pwnie Award for Most Innovative Research.
 The MD5 collision attack, with Alexander Sotirov, Marc Stevens, Arjen Lenstra, David Molnar, Dag Arne Osvik, and Benne de Weger. The proof of concept was to use a cluster of 200 Sony PlayStation 3 systems to create two valid SSL certificates containing an MD5 collision. The bogus "MD5 Collisions Inc." certificate authority still appears (blacklisted) in the Mozilla Firefox certificate store.
 Smart parking meter vulnerabilities, with Joe Grand and Chris Tarnovsky, presented as "'Smart' Parking Meter Implementations, Globalism, and You" at Black Hat 2008.
 The Open Observatory of Network Interference (OONI), founded in collaboration with Arturo Filastò to collect "data which will show an accurate topology of network surveillance, interference and outright censorship."

Art 

Appelbaum has taken part in a number of art projects with dissident artists including Laura Poitras, Trevor Paglen, Ai Weiwei, and Angela Richter. His art often straddles the borders of art, politics, and technology and has given rise to projects such as Panda to Panda (P2P) and the Autonomy Cube.

Appelbaum is also a photographer who has contributed still photographs to film and game projects. He exhibited his work in a solo show at NOME in 2016.

Appelbaum appeared in Laura Poitras's Academy Award-winning film Citizenfour (2014), which documents the public emergence of NSA whistle-blower Edward Snowden and the political circumstances leading to his actions. Appelbaum stars in Poitras's portrait of WikiLeaks founder Julian Assange, Risk (2016).

He was an artist in residence for the art group monochrom at Museumsquartier in 2006.

Activism 

Appelbaum represented Wikileaks founder Julian Assange in a keynote address at the 2010 HOPE conference.

In August 2013, Appelbaum delivered Edward Snowden's acceptance speech after he was awarded the biannual Whistleblower Prize by a group of NGOs at the Berlin-Brandenburg Academy of Sciences and Humanities.

Surveillance, airport detention, and WikiLeaks investigation
Appelbaum says he believes he has been under government surveillance since 2009, to the detriment of himself, his friends, and his close relations.  In interviews he has stated that living in Germany has given him a sense of relief from U.S. surveillance.  Appelbaum has described various aggressive surveillance events, and implies they are related to his work with WikiLeaks, to his privacy activism, and to relationships with other privacy activists, notably reporters linked to Edward Snowden. In December 2013, Appelbaum said he suspected the U.S. government of breaking into his Berlin apartment and using his computer.

While traveling, Appelbaum has been detained at airports and had his electronic equipment seized several times.

In 2010, the US Department of Justice obtained a court order compelling Twitter to provide data associated with the user accounts of Appelbaum, as well as several other individuals associated with WikiLeaks. While the order was originally sealed, Twitter successfully petitioned the court to unseal it, permitting the company to inform its users that their account information had been requested.

In September 2013, he testified before the European Parliament, mentioning that his partner had been spied on by men in night-vision goggles as she slept.

In 2015, it was revealed that Google had been forced to turn over information from his Gmail account.

In 2019, he told reporters that he had been contacted by Alexandria prosecutors about cooperating with the WikiLeaks grand jury for immunity, but had refused.

Allegations of sexual misconduct 
In March 2015, Appelbaum was suspended from his position at the Tor Project for ten days due to alleged incidents of harassment.

On 25 May 2016, Appelbaum stepped down from his position at Tor; this was announced on 2 June by the non-profit in a terse statement. On 4 June, Shari Steele, the executive director of the Tor project, published a much longer statement, noting that although prior allegations of sexual abuse regarding Appelbaum were consistent with "rumors some of us had been hearing for some time," that "the most recent allegations are much more serious and concrete than anything we had heard previously."

Also on 4 June, a website appeared with anonymous accounts of mistreatment by Appelbaum. Security engineer Leigh Honeywell came forward on 7 June to publicly relate the website's stories with her relationship with Appelbaum, in which she described Appelbaum ignoring a safeword and becoming violent. On 15 June, Alison Macrina (the director of the Library Freedom Project) and Isis Lovecruft (a Tor developer) publicly announced that the website's anonymous accounts of sexual abuse, under the pseudonyms of "Sam" and "Forest," respectively, were their own.

On 6 June, Appelbaum issued a statement denouncing the allegations as part of a concerted strategy to damage his reputation.

An anonymously leaked letter that the Tor Project's human resources manager had written to Appelbaum in conjunction with his March 2015 suspension for unprofessional conduct was published on 7 June.

In response to the allegations, the Cult of the Dead Cow ejected Appelbaum on 7 June, and the Freedom of the Press Foundation removed him from their volunteer technical advisory board on 8 June. Noisebridge announced on 10 June that co-founder Appelbaum had triggered their Anti-Harassment policy and is "no longer welcome in our community, either in its physical or online spaces," and on 17 June the Chaos Computer Club announced that he was not welcome. On 18 June his status as a Debian project developer was revoked. On 1 July Linux Australia barred Appelbaum from future events.

On 10 June, a woman whom three witnesses claimed to have seen being abused, denied the abuse allegations. In a statement released by Gizmodo journalist William Turton, she wrote that her experience was distorted and reported without her consent. On 17 June 2016, activists, journalists and legal professionals supporting Appelbaum signed a document defending his right to due process, and deploring the story's treatment by social media.

In June 2016, the façade of the building in which Appelbaum's Berlin apartment is located was defaced in English and German with graffiti directly referencing the allegations.

In July 2016 the Tor Project announced it had completed a seven-week investigation led by a hired investigator. According to Shari Steele, Tor Project "did everything in our power" to treat Mr. Appelbaum fairly, but "we determined that the allegations against him appear to be true." According to her summary of the investigation, which was not released, "many people inside and outside the Tor Project have reported incidents of being humiliated, intimidated, bullied, and frightened" by Jacob Appelbaum, and that "several experienced unwanted sexually aggressive behavior from him." Steele made no mention of rape claims published on the anonymous website.

In July 2016, Süddeutsche Zeitung reported that allegations against Appelbaum had been known in Berlin hacker circles for years. A hacker from Berlin told the newspaper that "I can feel a huge sense of relief that the silence has at last been broke." 

On 11 August 2016, the German weekly Die Zeit published a lengthy investigation into the rape charges, including interviews with three people present at the scene of the alleged rape. None of these witnesses corroborated the claims made by the anonymous victim. The article also reports that a second falsely identified victim had demanded that her story be removed from the anonymous website.

A change in attitude in the information security community towards calling out known abusers and believing reports of sexual misconduct was partially credited to Appelbaum's precedent.

Personal life
Appelbaum is an atheist of Jewish background and identifies himself as queer. Politically, he is an anarchist.

In 2012 he moved to Berlin, he has stated that he doesn't want to go back to the U.S. because he doesn't feel safe there and in interviews he has provided specific examples of experiences that left him feeling unsafe.

See also
 Hacktivism

References

External links

 
 

1983 births
Living people
Jewish American atheists
American computer scientists
Jewish American journalists
LGBT Jews
American LGBT scientists
American LGBT writers
Writers about computer security
University of Washington people
WikiLeaks
Computer security specialists
Cypherpunks
Internet activists
Queer men
Queer scientists
American expatriates in Germany
21st-century American non-fiction writers
Santa Rosa Junior College alumni